Helen Rankin may refer to:

 Helen Rankin (Ohio politician) (born 1936), former member of the Ohio House of Representatives
 Helen Rankin (Maine politician) (1931–2022), member of the Maine House of Representatives